Mandulak (also Romanized as Mandūlak; also known as Mandūlak-e Pā’īn) is a village in Howmeh Rural District, Central District, Garmsar County, Semnan Province, Iran. At the 2006 census, its population was 14, in 5 families.

References 

Populated places in Garmsar County